MWO may refer to:

Master warrant officer, a military rank in the Canadian Forces
Max Watts Out, a non-standard unit of power rating, aka Units Watts Out (UWO)
MechWarrior Online, a vehicular combat video game
Media Whores Online, a defunct left-wing blog
Meyer–Womble Observatory, an astronomical observatory near Mount Evans, Colorado, USA
Middletown Regional Airport, 
Militaire Willems-Orde (Military Order of William), a Netherlands chivalric order
Mount Washington Observatory, a scientific and educational institution with a weather observation station at Mount Washington in New Hampshire
Mount Wilson Observatory, an astronomical observatory in Los Angeles County, California, USA